Leclercville is a municipality located on the south shore of the Saint Lawrence River in the Municipalité régionale de comté de Lotbinière in Quebec, Canada. It is part of the Chaudière-Appalaches region and the population is 477 as of 2011.

History
It is named after Pierre Leclerc, a settler who gave a large portion of his land for the construction of the church, the rector and their dependencies.

The municipality's recent constitution dates from 2000 and follows the amalgamation of the village of Leclercville with the parish of Sainte-Emmélie, but both communities had been settled since the beginning of the 18th century, and most considerably at the end of the 19th century.

References

External links 

Commission de toponymie du Québec
Ministère des Affaires municipales, des Régions et de l'Occupation du territoire

Municipalities in Quebec
Incorporated places in Chaudière-Appalaches
Designated places in Quebec
Lotbinière Regional County Municipality